Cheilopogon is a genus of flyingfishes.

Species
Currently, 29  species in this genus are recognized:
 Cheilopogon abei Parin, 1996 (Abe's flyingfish)
 Cheilopogon agoo (Temminck & Schlegel, 1846) (Japanese flyingfish)
 Cheilopogon altipennis (Valenciennes, 1847) (smallhead flyingfish)
 Cheilopogon arcticeps (Günther, 1866) (white-finned flyingfish)
 Cheilopogon atrisignis (O. P. Jenkins, 1903) (glider flyingfish)
 Cheilopogon cyanopterus (Valenciennes, 1847) (margined flyingfish)
 Cheilopogon doederleinii (Steindachner, 1887)
 Cheilopogon dorsomacula (Fowler, 1944) (backspot flyingfish)
 Cheilopogon exsiliens (Linnaeus, 1771) (bandwing flyingfish)
 Cheilopogon furcatus (Mitchill, 1815) (spotfin flyingfish)
 Cheilopogon heterurus (Rafinesque, 1810) (Mediterranean flyingfish)
 Cheilopogon hubbsi (Parin, 1961) (blotchwing flyingfish)
 Cheilopogon intermedius Parin, 1961 (intermediate flyingfish)
 Cheilopogon katoptron (Bleeker, 1866) (Indonesian flyingfish)
 Cheilopogon melanurus (Valenciennes, 1847) (Atlantic flyingfish)
 Cheilopogon milleri (Gibbs & Staiger, 1970) (Guinean flyingfish)
 Cheilopogon nigricans (F. D. Bennett, 1840) (blacksail flyingfish)
 Cheilopogon olgae Parin, 2009
 Cheilopogon papilio (H. W. Clark, 1936) (butterfly flyingfish)
 Cheilopogon pinnatibarbatus (E. T. Bennett, 1831)
 Cheilopogon pinnatibarbatus californicus (J. G. Cooper, 1863) (California flyingfish)
 Cheilopogon pinnatibarbatus japonicus (V. Franz, 1910)
 Cheilopogon pinnatibarbatus melanocercus (J. D. Ogilby, 1885) (Australasian flying fish)
 Cheilopogon pinnatibarbatus pinnatibarbatus (E. T. Bennett, 1831) (Bennett's flyingfish)
 Cheilopogon pitcairnensis (Nichols & Breder, 1935)
 Cheilopogon rapanouiensis Parin, 1961 (Easter Island flyingfish)
 Cheilopogon spilonotopterus (Bleeker, 1866) (stained flyingfish)
 Cheilopogon spilopterus (Valenciennes, 1847) (manyspotted flyingfish)
 Cheilopogon suttoni (Whitley & Colefax, 1938) (Sutton's flyingfish)
 Cheilopogon unicolor (Valenciennes, 1847) (limpid-wing flyingfish)
 Cheilopogon ventralis (Nichols & Breder, 1935)
 Cheilopogon xenopterus (C. H. Gilbert, 1890) (whitetip flyingfish)

References

 
Cypsellurinae